Raymond Besse (1899–1969) was a French artist.

Biography
Raymond Besse was born in Niort, Deux-Sèvres on December 26, 1899. He spent his childhood in the Berry province of France.

Raymond Besse arrived in Paris in 1916. He exhibited for the first time in the Salon des Indépendants in 1923. He then continued to exhibit his works in many other exhibitions and salons, among them the Salon d'Automne. Raymond Besse's favorite topic was Paris. He loved to illustrate the life in and around the capital city, especially in the northern areas of Saint-Ouen, Montmartre, Clichy and around the Canal Saint-Martin.

Raymond Besse's themes of blue-collar Paris neighborhoods, associated to gloomy snowy weather make his artworks often dark and sad and as a result disregarded by many. Those paintings give a perfect picture of the life in the suburbs of Paris during the first part of the 20th century, far from the idyllic and colorful pictures left by artists like Édouard Cortès  (1882–1969), Antoine Blanchard (1910–1988) and Eugène Galien-Laloue (1854–1941).

The artist also painted many works about Normandy, villages in the Yonne area, and landscapes around Moret-sur-Loing. Raymond Besse finally moved to the Loire area at the end of his life, and he died in Candé-sur-Beuvron, Loir-et-Cher on March 5, 1969.

References

Sources
Dictionnaire des peintres à Montmartre, 640 pages, André Roussard (Editions) Jan 1999,

External links 
 Artnet Photos d’œuvres de Raymond Besse

1899 births
1969 deaths
People from Niort
20th-century French painters
20th-century French male artists
French male painters
19th-century French male artists